Napialus chongqingensis is a moth of the family Hepialidae. It is found in Chongqing, China, from which its species epithet is derived.

References

Moths described in 1992
Hepialidae